María Alharilla Casado Morente (born 13 November 1990) is a Spanish professional footballer who plays as a right back for Primera División club Levante UD and the Spain women's national team.

International career
Alharilla debuted for the Spain national team in a 2011 World Cup qualifier against Austria in October 2009. She subsequently scored her first goal in a 9–0 win over Malta.

International goals

Honours

International
Spain
 Cyprus Cup: Winner, 2018

References

External links
Profile at La Liga 

Profile at Txapeldunak.com 

1990 births
Living people
Footballers from Jaén, Spain
Spanish women's footballers
Women's association football wingers
Women's association football midfielders
Women's association football fullbacks
Sporting de Huelva players
Levante UD Femenino players
Primera División (women) players
Spain women's international footballers
21st-century Spanish women